Otomasicera is a genus of flies in the family Tachinidae.

Species
O. patella Townsend, 1912

References

Exoristinae
Diptera of North America
Tachinidae genera
Taxa named by Charles Henry Tyler Townsend